Alexandra Trofimov (born 16 June 1999) is a Moldovan footballer who plays as a midfielder for Women's Championship club FC Belceanka Bălți and the Moldova women's national team.

References

1999 births
Living people
Moldovan women's footballers
Women's association football midfielders
Moldova women's international footballers